Philipp Mohammed Kotoku Lartey (born 4 December 1986) is a German former professional footballer who played as a midfielder.

Career
Born in Düsseldorf, Lartey began his career with Garather SV, and VfL Leverkusen.

In summer 2001, he was scouted by Bayer 04 Leverkusen. After four years on youth side for Bayer 04, he was promoted to the second team that played in the Regionalliga Nord. He left after three semi-professional years as reserve of Bayer 04 and signed a contract with Holstein Kiel in summer 2008.

The team climbed to the 3. Liga in the 2008–09 season. He became the Player of the Year 2009 in Schleswig-Holstein Award. After this successful season, he left Holstein Kiel on 12 June 2009 and signed with Rot Weiss Ahlen. After one year and the relegation of Rot-Weiss Ahlen, he signed on 10 June 2010 to FC Hansa Rostock on a one-year contract.

Personal life
Lartey holds both a Ghanaian passport and a German passport.

Honours
 2009: Player of the Year in Schleswig-Holstein

References

External links
 

1986 births
Living people
German sportspeople of Ghanaian descent
German footballers
Footballers from Düsseldorf
Association football midfielders
2. Bundesliga players
3. Liga players
Regionalliga players
Bayer 04 Leverkusen II players
Holstein Kiel players
Rot Weiss Ahlen players
FC Hansa Rostock players